Pedro Martins may refer to:

 Pedro Martins (racewalker) (born 1968), Portuguese race walker
 Pedro Martins (badminton) (born 1990), Portuguese badminton player
 Pedro Martins (footballer) (born 1970), Portuguese retired footballer 
 Pedro Henrique Martins (born 1985), Brazilian footballer
 Pedro Martins, Lord of the Tower of Vasconcelos, Portuguese 12th-century noble knight